The Martin P4M Mercator was a maritime reconnaissance aircraft built by the Glenn L. Martin Company. The Mercator was an unsuccessful contender for a United States Navy requirement for a long-range maritime patrol bomber, with the Lockheed P2V Neptune chosen instead. It saw a limited life as a long-range electronic reconnaissance aircraft. Its most unusual feature was that it was powered by a combination of piston engines and turbojets, the latter being in the rear of the engine nacelles.

Design and development
Work began on the Model 219 in 1944, as a replacement for the PB4Y Privateer long-range patrol bomber, optimised for long range minelaying missions, with the first flight being on 20 October 1946. A large and complicated aircraft, it was powered by two Pratt & Whitney R4360 Wasp Major 28-cylinder radial engines. To give a boost during takeoff and combat, two Allison J33 turbojets were fitted in the rear of the two enlarged engine nacelles, the intakes being beneath and behind the radial engines. The jets, like those on most other piston/jet hybrids, burned gasoline instead of jet fuel which eliminated the need for separate fuel tanks.

A tricycle undercarriage was fitted, with the nosewheel retracting forwards. The single-wheel main legs retracted into coverless fairings in the wings, so that the sides of the wheels could be seen even when retracted. The wings themselves, unusually, had a different airfoil cross-section on the inner wings than the outer.

Heavy defensive armament was fitted, with two 20 mm (.79 in) cannon in an Emerson nose turret and a Martin tail turret, and two 0.5 in (12.7 mm) machine guns in a Martin dorsal turret. The bomb bay was, like British practice, long and shallow rather than the short and deep bay popular in American bombers. This gave greater flexibility in payload, including long torpedoes, bombs, mines, depth charges or extended-range fuel tanks.

Operational history

The US Navy chose the smaller, simpler, cheaper and better performing P2V Neptune for the maritime patrol requirement, but nineteen aircraft were ordered in 1947 for high-speed minelaying purposes. The P4M entered service with Patrol Squadron 21 (VP-21) in 1950, the squadron deploying to NAS Port Lyautey in French Morocco. It remained in use with VP-21 until February 1953.

From 1951, the 18 surviving production P4Ms were modified for the electronic reconnaissance (or SIGINT, for signals intelligence) mission as the P4M-1Q, to replace the PB4Y-2 Privateer. The crew was increased to 14 and later 16 to operate all the surveillance gear, and the aircraft was fitted with a large number of different antennae.

Starting in October 1951, electronic surveillance missions were flown from U.S. Naval Station Sangley Point in the Philippines, later from Naval Air Station Iwakuni, Japan, and Naval Air Station Atsugi, Japan, by a secretive unit that eventually gained the designation Fleet Air Reconnaissance Squadron One (VQ-1). Operational missions were always flown at night, during the dark with the moon when possible, and with no external running lights.

Losses
 On 8 March 1951 Mercator flew into Atlantic Ocean off Florida-4 killed.
 On 6 February 1952, ditched north of Cyprus at night, out of fuel, with no power, losing only the Aircraft Commander/pilot after they were in the water (See United States Naval Institute, Naval History, March/April 1997). The crew was rescued by HMS Chevron.
 On 22 August 1956 one Mercator was shot down near Shanghai by Chinese fighters of the 2nd Aviation Division, with its crew of 16 all killed.
 On November 19, 1957 Mercator lost in accident
 On 6 January 1958, P4M-1Q of JQ-3 crashed at Ocean View, Virginia,  when it lost an engine on approach to NAS Norfolk, Virginia, killing four crew and injuring three civilians.
 On 16 June 1959 a P4M-1Q was attacked by two North Korean MiG-17s with heavy damage and serious injury to the tail gunner.
 On 19 January 1960, VQ-2  P4M-1Q JQ-16 (buno 124365) crashed en route to Adana AFB killing all 16 aircrew. The RAF Mountain Rescue Team based at Nicosia, Cyprus recovered the bodies of 12 crew members before being forced to leave the recovery of the remaining bodies/parts until the spring. the Mercators were replaced by the EA-3B Skywarrior, which, being carrier-based, had a greater degree of flexibility and the larger Lockheed WV-2Q Warning Star. Final withdrawal from service was in 1960 after which all of the remaining P4Ms were scrapped.

Variants
XP4M-1
Two prototype aircraft with two R-4360-4 engines.
P4M-1
Production aircraft with two R-4360-20A engines, 19 built.
P4M-1Q
P4M-1s redesignated when modified for radar countermeasures.

Operators

 United States Navy

Specifications (P4M-1 Mercator)

See also

References

 Dorr, Robert F. and Richard R. Burgess. "Ferreting Mercators". Air International, October 1993, Vol.45, No. 4. ISSN 0306-5634. pp. 215–222.
 Lake, Jon and Robert F. Dorr. "Martin P4M Mercator". Wings of Fame. Volume 19. London:Aerospace Publishing, 2000. . pp. 138–149.
 Roberts, Michael D. Dictionary of American Naval Aviation Squadrons:Volume 2: The History of VP, VPB, VP(HL) and VP(AM) Squadrons. Washington, DC:Naval Historical Center, 2000.

External links

Aircraft with auxiliary jet engines
Martin PM4 Mercator
P4M
Aircraft first flown in 1946